Dean Graham Brownlie (born 30 July 1984) is an Australian-born international New Zealand cricketer, currently playing for the Northern Districts cricket team in New Zealand domestic cricket. He has represented the New Zealand national cricket team in all three formats, qualifying to represent the team by way of his father's birthplace.

Early career
Brownlie was born in Perth, Western Australia. He grew up playing both cricket and Australian rules football, representing the Mount Lawley District Cricket Club in the WACA District Cricket competition, and the West Perth Football Club at colts and reserves levels. He represented Western Australia at the 2001 Under-17 and the 2002 Under-19 national carnivals.

He played for Whitstable in the Kent Cricket League during the 2003 English cricket season as their overseas player. He made 455 runs at an average of 26.76, including one century, and also took 20 wickets.

Domestic career
Brownlie moved to New Zealand in 2009 to play for Canterbury. He made his List A debut the same season in 2010, making a golden duck on debut. However, he went on to score 86* in his second match. He then scored a century in his Plunket Shield début against Northern Districts. In June 2018, he was awarded a contract with Northern Districts for the 2018–19 season.

He was the leading run-scorer for Northern Districts in the 2018–19 Ford Trophy, with 293 runs in nine matches.

International career
He made his Twenty20 debut in January 2010 against Pakistan in 2010.

After playing several matches for the New Zealand A, he made his Test debut for the national team against Zimbabwe in November 2011 after an injury to Jesse Ryder, qualifying to represent New Zealand by way of his father, who was born in Christchurch. Brownlie scored 63 in his first innings on debut, and also took one wicket bowling medium pace in Zimbabwe's first innings.

He then played in the Australian test series and was New Zealand's best batsman, scoring 77 unbeaten in Brisbane.

On 5 February 2017, Brownlie replaced Martin Guptill in the final match of Chappell-Hadlee series in Hamilton, marking his first match in international level in 2 years. He also scored his first ODI half-century.

References

External links
 

1984 births
Australian cricketers
Canterbury cricketers
Northern Districts cricketers
Living people
New Zealand cricketers
New Zealand Test cricketers
New Zealand One Day International cricketers
New Zealand Twenty20 International cricketers
Cricketers from Perth, Western Australia
South Island cricketers